is a city located in Nagano Prefecture, Japan. , the city had an estimated population of 50,828 in 19,979 households, and a population density of 334 persons per km².

Geography
Suzaka is located in northern Nagano Prefecture on the alluvial fan where the Matsukawa River joins the  Chikuma River.

Surrounding municipalities
Nagano Prefecture
 Ueda
 Nagano
 Obuse
 Takayama
 Gunma Prefecture
 Tsumagoi

Climate
The city has a climate characterized by characterized by hot and humid summers, and relatively mild winters (Köppen climate classification Cfa).  The average annual temperature in Suzaka is 10.5 °C. The average annual rainfall is 1189 mm with September as the wettest month. The temperatures are highest on average in August, at around 23.8 °C, and lowest in January, at around -2.2 °C.

Demographics
Per Japanese census data, the population of Suzaka has remained relatively stable over the past 40 years.

History
Suzaka is located in former Shinano Province and was a castle town for Suzaka Domain under the Edo period Tokugawa shogunate. In the post-Meiji restoration cadastral reform of April 1,1 1889, the modern town of Suzaka was established. Suzuka annexed the village of Hitaki on December 1, 1936 and the villages of Hino and Toyosu on February 11, 1954. Suzaka was elevated to city status on April 1, 1954. On January 1, 1955, Suzaka annexed the neighbouring villages of Inoue and Takahe, followed by the village of Azuma on April 30, 1971.

Government
Suzaka has a mayor-council form of government with a directly elected mayor and a unicameral city legislature of 20 members.

Economy
The city was noted in the Meiji period for its silk industry. After World War II, an electronics industry was established. Fujitsu Corporation has a plant in Suzaka. The city is also noted for apples and grapes, and the Prefectural Agricultural Research Station is located in Suzaka.

Education
Suzaka has eleven public elementary schools and four public middle schools operated by the city government, and three public high schools operated by the Nagano Prefectural Board of Education.

Transportation

Railway
  Nagano Electric Railway 
  -  -  -

Highway
 Jōshin-etsu Expressway

International relations
 - Siping, Jilin, China, friendship city since May 12, 1994

Local attractions
 Garyu Park, one of Japan's Top 100 Sakura Spots
 Yonako Falls, one of Japan's Top 100 Waterfalls
 Suzaka Municipal Zoo

References

External links

Official Website 

 
Cities in Nagano Prefecture